"Step by Step" is a crossover song co-written and recorded by American country music artist Eddie Rabbitt.  It was released in July 1981 as the first single and title track from the album Step by Step.  The song was Rabbitt's ninth number one single on the country chart.  The single stayed at number one for one week and spent a total of 11 weeks on the country chart.  It was written by Rabbitt, Even Stevens and David Malloy.

Content
In the song, the narrator instructs a friend on how to attract the attentions of a woman to whom he's attracted, concluding the chorus with "step by step, you'll win her love".

"Step by Step" maintained Eddie Rabbitt's crossover appeal when the single made it to number five in the Top 40.

Chart performance

References

1981 singles
1981 songs
Eddie Rabbitt songs
Songs written by Eddie Rabbitt
Songs written by David Malloy
Song recordings produced by David Malloy
Elektra Records singles
Songs written by Even Stevens (songwriter)